Golpe De Estado is a compilation album by various artist from the Machete Music label. It was released on January 12, 2010. The album featured some of reggaeton's biggest upcoming talent including Arcángel, Ivy Queen, Zion & Lennox and Héctor "El Father" among others. The album managed to debut and peak at number 12 on the Billboard Latin Rhythm Albums chart. It spawned two singles "Como Tu Me Tocas" performed by Arcángel, and "La Velita" performed by Arcángel, Ivy Queen, Zion and Jadiel. The singles, however, were not as successful, and thus failed to obtain chart success.

Background
Golpe De Estado includes songs by some of "Reggaeton's biggest stars" such as Ivy Queen, Arcángel, Zion & Lennox, Héctor "El Father", Cosculluela, Yomo and many more. The lead single "Como Tu Me Tocas" by Arcángel was released on October 29, 2009. The second single "La Velita" by Arcángel, Ivy Queen, Zion and Jadiel was released on November 3, 2009. "El Recuerdo", a bachata track is performed by Ivy Queen. Other artist including Tito El Bambino were originally to be included on the album.

Musical composition
"El Recuerdo", a bachata track is performed by Ivy Queen. Hector "El Father" performed "Ven Donde Mí", a romantic reggaeton song.

Track listing
Standard Edition

Credits and personnel
Adapted from Allmusic

Austín Santos "Arcángel" – Primary Artist, Composer
Joel Baez – Composer
Sergio Bustamante – Composer
Urbani Mota Cedeño – Composer, Producer
Cosculluela – Primary Artist, Composer
Jose Cotto – Mixing
Carlos Crespo – Composer
Luis Eloy Hernández "Eloy" – Primary Artist, Composer
Ariel Harrigan – Composer
Héctor "El Father" – Primary Artist, Composer, Producer
Paul Irizarry – Composer
Martha Pesante "Ivy Queen" – Primary Artist, Composer
Ramon Gonazalez "Jadiel" – Featured Artist, Composer
George M. Ladkani – Composer
Robert Martinez Lebron "Lennox"  – Primary Artist; Composer
Eliel Lind – Composer, Producer
Los Metalicos – Producer
Freddy Melendez – Primary Artist, Composer
Carlos Morales – Composer
Ñejo  – Primary Artist
Felix Ortiz "Zion" – Primary Artist, Composer
Edwin Z. Perez "EZP" – Composer, Producer
Esteban Piñero – Mastering, Mixing, Arranging
Gabriel Pizarro – Composer
Pedro Polanco – Composer, Producer
Giovany Reyes – Mixing
Yazid Rivera – Composer, Producer
Gabriel Rodríguez – Composer, Producer
Rafael Del Rosario – Composer
Waldemar Sabad – Composer
Francisco Saldaña – Producer
Juan Santana – Composer
Luny Tunes – Producer
Yomo – Primary Artist

Charts

References

2010 compilation albums
Machete Music compilation albums
Reggaeton compilation albums
Bachata compilation albums
Albums produced by Luny Tunes
Albums produced by Noriega